Carballeda de Valdeorras is a larger municipality in Ourense in the Galicia region of north-west Spain. It is located towards the very north-east of the province in the comarca of Valdeorras.

The only Taxus baccata forest in Galicia is located within this municipal term.

Villages 
 Candeda
 Carballeda
 Casaio
 Casoio
 Domiz
 Lardeira
 A Portela do Trigal
 Pumares
 Pusmazán
 Riodolas
 Robledo
 San Xusto
 Santa Cruz
 Sobradelo
 Soutadoiro
 Vila
 Viladequinta

External links
Valdeorras site
Comarca de Valdeorras

References  

Municipalities in the Province of Ourense